Leykina Island (Russian: Ostrov Leykina; the English name is a literal transliteration. The accurate name would be Leykin's Island or Leykin Island), formerly Ostrov Osushnoy, is an island in the Laptev Sea. It is located off the Olenyok Gulf, roughly midway between Peschanyy Island and the Dunay Islands.

Geography
Although Leykina Island appears in Russian maps (Russian Hydrographic Office chart no 11142), it is not listed in the British Admiralty sailing directions. The Admiralty pilot describes the charted location of the island as ‘doubtful’.

A British yachtsman visiting the area recently failed to find Leykina Island, being able to discern only: "...A ring of small breakers clearly demarcated what I took to be the 5-metre contour line as the seabed shoaled towards where the island should be."

Leykina might be an island of the Russian Arctic that has eroded away and disappeared in recent times, like Semyonovsky, Figurina, Vasilievsky and Merkuriya.

Administration
For administrative purposes Leykina Island belongs to the Sakha (Yakutia) Republic of the Russian Federation.

References

External links
 Erosion of Arctic coast

Islands of the Laptev Sea
Islands of the Sakha Republic
Former islands of Russia